Prashant Aryal is a journalist based in Kathmandu, who was the editor-in-chief of Kantipur Television Network. He was previously the Editor-in-Chief of Nepal Magazine in between 2008 and 2018. He is currently Editor-in-chief of Galaxy 4K TV.

Early life and career
He was born in Kailali and started his journalism career in 1993 with Suruchi weekly. In August 2008, he was appointed as the Editor of Chief of Nepal Magazine succeeding Sudheer Sharma. He has worked with Himal Khabarpatrika, Kantipur and Pro Public among others in the past. He has BA in Journalism and MA in Sociology and Anthropology from Tribhuvan University.

Awards 
He is the recipient of Govinda Biyogi Journalism Award- 2017 and Lilaram-Kuntidevi Neupane Journalism Award-2014.

References

Nepalese journalists
Year of birth missing (living people)
Living people
Khas people